Massachusetts House of Representatives' 3rd Hampden district in the United States is one of 160 legislative districts included in the lower house of the Massachusetts General Court. It covers part of Hampden County. Republican Nick Boldyga of Southwick has represented the district since 2011.

Towns represented
The district includes the following localities:
 Agawam
 Granville
 Southwick

The current district geographic boundary overlaps with that of the Massachusetts Senate's 2nd Hampden and Hampshire district.

Former locale
The district previously covered part of Springfield, circa 1872.

Representatives
 Roderick Burt, circa 1858 
 Randolph Stebbins, circa 1859 
 Reuben Winchester, circa 1888 
 William H. Grady, circa 1920 
 John Mitchell, circa 1920 
 Ernest Deroy, circa 1951 
 Edward W. Connelly, circa 1975 
 Nicholas A. Boldyga, 2011-current

See also
 List of Massachusetts House of Representatives elections
 Other Hampden County districts of the Massachusetts House of Representatives: 1st, 2nd,  4th, 5th, 6th, 7th, 8th, 9th, 10th, 11th, 12th
 Hampden County districts of the Massachusett Senate: Berkshire, Hampshire, Franklin, and Hampden; Hampden; 1st Hampden and Hampshire; 2nd Hampden and Hampshire
 List of Massachusetts General Courts
 List of former districts of the Massachusetts House of Representatives

Images
Portraits of legislators

References

Further reading

External links
 Ballotpedia. Massachusetts House of Representatives Third Hampden District
  (State House district information based on U.S. Census Bureau's American Community Survey).

House
Government of Hampden County, Massachusetts